The International Olympiad in Informatics (IOI) is an annual competitive programming and one of the International Science Olympiads for secondary school students. It is the second largest science olympiad, after International Mathematical Olympiad, in terms of number of participating countries (88 at IOI 2022). The first IOI was held in 1989 in Pravetz, Bulgaria.

The contest consists of two days of computer programming/coding and problem-solving of algorithmic nature. To deal with problems involving very large amounts of data, it is necessary to have not only programmers, "but also creative coders, who can dream up what it is that the programmers need to tell the computer to do. The hard part isn't the programming, but the mathematics underneath it." Students at the IOI compete on an individual basis, with up to four students competing from each participating country (with 81 countries in 2012). Students in the national teams are selected through national computing contests, such as the British Informatics Olympiad, Indian Computing Olympiad, Romanian Olympiad in Informatics, or Bundeswettbewerb Informatik (Germany).

The International Olympiad in Informatics is one of the most prestigious computer science competitions in the world. UNESCO and IFIP are patrons.

Competition structure and participation 
On each of the two competition days, the students are typically given three problems which they have to solve in five hours. Each student works on his/her own, with only a computer and no other help allowed, specifically no communication with other contestants, books etc. Usually to solve a task the contestant has to write a computer program (only in C++) and submit it before the five-hour competition time ends. The program is graded by being run with secret test data. From IOI 2010, tasks are divided into subtasks with graduated difficulty, and points are awarded only when all tests for a particular subtask yield correct results, within specific time and memory limits. In some cases, the contestant's program has to interact with a secret computer library, which allows problems where the input is not fixed, but depends on the program's actions – for example in game problems. Another type of problem has known inputs which are publicly available already during the five hours of the contest. For these, the contestants have to submit an output file instead of a program, and it is up to them whether they obtain the output files by writing a program (possibly exploiting special characteristics of the input), or by hand, or by a combination of these means. Pascal has been removed as an available programming language as of 2019.:11

IOI 2010 for the first time had a live web scoreboard with real-time provisional results.  Submissions will be scored as soon as possible during the contest, and the results posted. Contestants will be aware of their scores, but not others', and may resubmit to improve their scores. Starting from 2012, IOI has been using the Contest Management System (CMS) for developing and monitoring the contest.

The scores from the two competition days and all problems are summed up separately for each contestant. At the awarding ceremony, contestants are awarded medals depending on their relative total score. The top 50% of the contestants are awarded medals, such that the relative number of gold : silver : bronze : no medal is approximately 1:2:3:6 (thus 1/12 of the contestants get a gold medal).

Prior to IOI 2010, students who did not receive medals did not have their scores published, making it impossible for a country to be ranked by adding together scores of its competitors unless each wins a medal. From IOI 2010, although the scores of students who did not receive medals are still not available in the official results, they are known from the live web scoreboard. In IOI 2012 the top 3 nations ranked by aggregate score (Russia, China and USA) were subsequently awarded during the closing ceremony.

Analysis of female performance shows 77.9% of women obtain no medal, while 49.2% of men obtain no medal. "The average female participation was 4.4% in 1989–1994 and 2.2% in 1996–2014." It also suggests much higher participation of women on the national level, claiming sometimes double-digit percentages in total participation on the first stage. President of the IOI, Richard Forster, says the competition has difficulty attracting women and that in spite of trying to solve it, "none of us have hit on quite what the problem is, let alone the solution."

In IOI 2017 held in Iran, due to not being able to participate in Iran, the Israeli students participated in an offsite competition organized by IOI in Russia.:11 Due to visa issues, the full USA team was unable to attend, although one contestant Zhezheng Luo was able to attend by traveling with the Chinese team and winning gold medal and 3rd place in standings.

In IOI 2019 held in Azerbaijan, the Armenia team did not participate due to the dispute between the two countries, despite the guarantees provided and official invitation letter sent by the host Azerbaijan.

Due to the COVID-19 pandemic, both the IOI 2020 and IOI 2021, originally scheduled to be hosted by Singapore, were held as online contests. The IOI 2022, hosted by Indonesia, was held as a hybrid event, with around 25% of the contestants participating online.

Summary

All Time Medal Table

Multiple IOI winners

The following is a list of the top performers in the history of the IOI. The P sign indicates a perfect score, a rare achievement in IOI history. The U sign indicates an unofficial participation, where a contestant participated in a host's second team. Also, first (I), second (II) and third (III) places among gold medalists are indicated where appropriate. This list includes only those countries where the national selection contest allows the same participant to go multiple times to the IOI.

Feeder competitions 
Most participating countries use feeder competitions to select their team. A number of these are listed below:

Notes 
1.IOI 2020 virtual closing ceremony was held on September 23, 2020.

See also 

 List of computer science awards
 International Science Olympiad
 ACM International Collegiate Programming Contest
 Central European Olympiad in Informatics
 Online judge
 International Mathematical Olympiad

References

External links 

 International Olympiad in Informatics (IOI) community (hosted on Commonlounge)
 IOI International Committee Website
 IOI Statistics
 IOI Secretariat Website

Programming contests
Computer science competitions
Recurring events established in 1989
International Science Olympiad